These are the lists of notable Taiwan exchange-traded funds, or ETFs.

Domestic ETFs

ETFs with Domestic Component Securities 
The component stocks of these ETFs are Taiwanese companies listed on Taiwan Stock Exchange or Gre Tai Securities Market (Taiwan OTC market):
 0050 Yuanta/P-shares Taiwan Top 50 ETF – tracks the  FTSE TWSE Taiwan 50 Index 
 0051 Yuanta/P-shares Taiwan Mid-Cap 100 ETF
 0052 Fubon Taiwan Technology ETF - tracks the TSEC Taiwan Technology Index
 0053 Yuanta/P-shares Taiwan Electronics Tech ETF
 0054 Yuanta/P-shares S&P Custom China Play 50 ETF	
 0055 Yuanta/P-shares MSCI Taiwan Financials ETF	
 0056 Yuanta/P-shares Taiwan Dividend Plus ETF
 0057 Fubon MSCI Taiwan ETF
 0058 Fubon Taiwan Eight Industries ETF delisted
 0059 Fubon Taiwan Finance ETF - tracks the TSEC Taiwan Finance and Insurance Index delisted
 0060 Yuanta/P-shares TSEC Taiwan Non-Tech 50 ETF. This ETF was delisted on February 26, 2016.
 006201 Yuanta/P-shares Taiwan GreTai 50 ETF, tracks GreTai 50 Index
 006203 Yuanta/ P-shares MSCI Taiwan ETF	
 006204 Sinopac Taiwan TAIEX Index ETF
 006208 Fubon Taiwan 50 Index ETF – same as 0050, tracks the FTSE TWSE Taiwan 50 Index

ETFs with Offshore Component Securities 
These ETFs are issued by Taiwanese investment companies, including Yuanta and Fubon, while their component stocks are listed on Hong Kong Stock Exchange (HKSE), Shanghai Stock Exchange (SSE), or Shenzhen Stock Exchange (SZSE):

 006205 Fubon SSE 180 Index ETF, tracks SSE 180 index
 006206 Yuanta SSE 50 Securities Investment Trust Fund ETF, tracks SSE 50 index
 006207 Fuh Hwa CSI 300 A Shares ETF, tracks CSI 300 Index
 00636 Cathay FTSE China A50 ETF, tracks FTSE China A50 index
 00639 Fubon SZSE 100 Index ETF, tracks SZSE 100 Index
 00643 Capital SZSE SME Price Index ETF, tracks SZSE SME Price Index
 00645 Fubon TOPIX ETF, tracks TOPIX Index
 00646 Yuanta S&P 500 ETF, tracks S&P500® Index
 00649 Fuh Hwa Hang Seng ETF, tracks Hang Seng Index
 00652 Fubon NIFTY ETF, closely track the performance of NIFTY Index
 0061 W.I.S.E. Yuanta/P-shares CSI 300 ETF, tracks CSI 300 Index

Bond ETF 
Due to low trading volumes (liquidity problems) and discount to Net Asset Value (NAV) long since issuance, the beneficiaries voted and determined the sole bond ETF to be liquidated in 2013:
 006202 Yuanta/P-shares Taiwan Government Bond ETF, tracked the GreTai Taiwan Treasury Benchmark Index, consisting of 5-year, 10-year and 20-year treasury bonds issued by Taiwan Government. This ETF was delisted on May 21, 2013 and liquidated on May 27, 2013.

Offshore ETFs 
These ETFs are also listed and traded in different currencies on other stock exchanges:
 0080 Hang Seng Investment Index Funds Series - H-Share Index ETF, also listed at Hong Kong Stock Exchange This ETF was delisted on December 9, 2015.
 0081 Hang Seng Investment Index Funds Series II - Hang Seng Index ETF, also listed at Hong Kong Stock Exchange and Shenzhen Stock Exchange This ETF was delisted on December 9, 2015.
 008201 BOCI-Prudential - W.I.S.E. - SSE 50 China Tracker, also listed at Hong Kong Stock Exchange

Leveraged and Inverse ETFs 
 00631L Yuanta Daily Taiwan 50 Bull 2X ETF, closely track the 2X performance of Taiwan 50 Index
 00632R Yuanta Daily Taiwan 50 Bear -1X ETF, closely track the inverse performance of Taiwan 50 Index
 00633L Fubon SSE180 Leveraged 2X Index ETF, closely track the performance of SSE180 Leveraged 2X Index
 00634R Fubon SSE180 Inversed Index ETF, closely track the performance of SSE180 Inversed Index
 00637L Yuanta Daily CSI300 Bull 2X ETF, closely track the performance of CSI 300 Daily Return Leveraged 2X Index
 00638R Yuanta Daily CSI 300 Bear -1X ETF, closely track the performance of CSI 300 Daily Return Inversed Index
 00640L Fubon TOPIX Leveraged 2X Index ETF, closely track the performance of TOPIX Leverage 2X Index
 00641R Fubon TOPIX Inverse -1X Index ETF, closely track the performance of TOPIX Inverse -1X Index
 00647L Yuanta Daily S&P 500 Bull 2X ETF, closely track the performance of S&P 500R PR 2X Leverage Carry-Free Daily Index
 00648R Yuanta Daily S&P 500 Inverse ETF, closely track the performance of S&P 500 PR Inverse Carry Free Daily Index
 00650L Fuh Hwa Daily Hang Seng Leveraged 2X ETF, Closely track the performance of HSI Leveraged Index
 00651R Fuh Hwa Daily Hang Seng Inversed ETF, Closely track the performance of HSI Short Index

Futures ETFs 
 00635U Yuanta S&P GSCI Gold ER Futures ETF, closely track the performance of S&P GSCI Gold Excess Return Index
 00642U Yuanta S&P GSCI Crude Oil ER Futures ETF, closely track the performance of S&P GSCI Crude Oil Enhanced Excess Return Index

External links
Taiwan ETFs
Taiwan Gretai ETF

See also
List of exchange-traded funds
List of American exchange-traded funds

Taiwan